The state of Kentucky will elected an Auditor of Public Accounts November 8, 2011.  Primaries for this election were held on Tuesday May 17, 2011. In the November 8, 2011 general election, Democrat Adam Edelen was elected to his first term as Auditor.

The auditor checks the financial books of all state agencies, school districts and county governments and performs special investigations.

Background
Current Auditor of Public Accounts Crit Luallen (D) is ineligible to run due to term limits.

Candidates
Based on the candidate filing report with the office of the Kentucky Secretary of State after the January 25, 2011 filing deadline, the following candidates filed to run for Auditor.

Republican primary

Nominated 
John T. Kemper, Lexington area small residential builder/developer

Eliminated in primary 
Addia Wuchner, state representative from Hebron in Boone County

Democrats
 Adam Edelen, former chief of staff to Governor Steve Beshear

General election

Polling

Results

See also
 Kentucky Elections, 2011

References

External links
 Adam Edelen for Auditor
John T. Kemper for Aubitor

auditor
Kentucky State Auditor elections
Kentucky